CTAL is an initialism that may have following meanings:

 Confederación de los Trabajadores de América Latina, a continental trade union federation for Latin America in the mid-1920th century
 International Software Testing Qualifications Board#Certifications (ISTQB Advanced Level), the higher level software tester certification of ISTQB